Badawi El-Bedewi (born 14 May 1942) is an Egyptian boxer. He competed in the men's featherweight event at the 1964 Summer Olympics.

References

1942 births
Living people
Egyptian male boxers
Olympic boxers of Egypt
Boxers at the 1964 Summer Olympics
Place of birth missing (living people)
Featherweight boxers
20th-century Egyptian people